Bodorova may refer to:

 the Slovak village Bodorová
 the composer Sylvie Bodorová.